The 1957–58 Egyptian Premier League, was the 8th season of the Egyptian Premier League, the top Egyptian professional league for association football clubs. The season started on 25 October 1957 and concluded on 23 May 1958, and it was the first time that the league table consisted of two groups consisting of 8 clubs.
Defending champions Al Ahly won their 8th consecutive and 8th overall Egyptian Premier League title in the season.

League table

Group 1

Group 2

Play-off

References

External links 
 All Egyptian Competitions Info

5
1957–58 in African association football leagues